Jews With Horns is the third album by the American klezmer band the Klezmatics, released in 1995. It is the first album on which Matt Darriau performed, which led to his induction as a full member of the group. Marc Ribot is featured on the second track, "Fisherlid".

Critical reception
The Washington Post thought that "the Klezmatics are capable of the slow, lovely, horn-and-violin harmonies of the traditional 'Romanian Fantasy' or the exuberant Hasidic vocals of 'Nign'."

AllMusic wrote that "the fast numbers ... are frenzied celebratory drinking songs—a true revival of the community spirit which spawned this eastern European brand of folk music."

Track listing
 Man in a Hat
 Fisherlid
 Khsidim tants
 Simkhes-toyre
 Romanian Fantasy
 Bulgars / The Kiss
 Nign
 Honga
 In Kampf
 Doyna
 Freyt aykh, yidlekh
 Kale bazetsn
 Heyser tartar-tants
 
 Overture

Personnel 
Frank London - trumpet, cornet, alto horn, piano, organ, vocals
Lorin Sklamberg - accordion, piano, lead vocals
Paul Morrissett - bass, vocals
David Licht - drums
David Krakauer - clarinet, bass clarinet, vocals
Alicia Svigals - violin, vocals
Ray "Chinito" Diaz - guiro (Track 1)
Moxy Früvous - backing vocals (1)
Matt Darriau - alto saxophone (2, 15), backing vocals (4)
Marc Ribot - electric guitar (2)
Betty Silberman - backing vocals (2)
Adrienne Cooper - vocals (14)

References

The Klezmatics albums
1995 albums
Yiddish culture in the United States